Kosher style refers to foods commonly associated with Jewish cuisine but which may or may not actually be kosher. It is a stylistic designation rather than one based on the laws of kashrut. Generally, kosher-style food does not include meat from forbidden animals, such as pigs and shellfish, and does not contain both meat and milk in the same dish; however if such dish includes meat, it may not be kosher slaughtered. In some U.S. states, the use of this term in advertising is illegal as a misleading term under consumer protection laws.

Jews who do not keep kosher but wish to restrict themselves to eating "traditional style" foods, usually not eating forbidden animals or mixing milk and meat, may consider themselves to keep "kosher style".

History 
The term "kosher style" was invented by Nathan Handwerker, co-founder of Nathan's Famous. Because Nathan's lacked rabbinic supervision and the meat was not kosher, Handwerker advertised his all-beef hot dogs as "kosher style" because they were not made from pork or horse meat, both of which are considered treif.

Kashrut law 
Almost always, when a restaurant calls itself kosher style, the food is not actually kosher according to traditional halakhic (Jewish law) standards. The Reuben sandwich, which contains meat and cheese, is not kosher, nor is the Monte Cristo sandwich, made with ham and cheese. Dairy-based desserts such as cheesecake may be offered as complements to a meat dish. However, since fish is pareve (neither meat nor dairy), lox on a bagel spread with cream cheese may be kosher if the lox meets the requirements of kashrut.

Jews who adhere strictly to the laws of kashrut will not eat at kosher-style establishments. Furthermore, the fact that such establishments appear to be kosher can be deceptive to Jews who are visiting an unfamiliar city and looking for kosher food. Some of these establishments are also open on the Jewish sabbath for business when this is forbidden by halakha. Others may choose to eat at but not consume meat or cheese at such restaurants.

Dining establishments 
Some dining establishments, notably delicatessens, serve kosher-style food. This usually means that they serve traditional Ashkenazic Jewish foods, such as chopped liver, bagels with cream cheese and lox, smoked sable, whitefish salad, gefilte fish, knishes, latkes, blintzes, cabbage rolls, egg cream, matzo ball soup, borscht, kasha varnishkes, stuffed derma, p'tcha, cholent, kugel, pickles, sauerkraut, and cold cut sandwiches, especially pastrami, corned beef, brisket and beef tongue. Some kosher-style delis also serve Sephardi and Mizrahi staples such as shawarma, falafel, hummus, Israeli salad, malawach, and shakshouka. 

Several notable restaurants in Lower Manhattan fit into the kosher-style genre, including Katz's Delicatessen and Russ & Daughters. Canter's restaurant in Los Angeles and Montreal's Schwartz's deli also fall into this category.

In Toronto, several kosher-style restaurants (e.g., Meyers, Shopsy's) now serve pork products, such as bacon, ham, ribs, and sausage, in order to serve a larger number of customers. Some kosher-style hotdog restaurants, such as Max's Famous Hotdogs and The Windmill, use pork as well as beef hot dogs.

See also
 Kosher by ingredient
 Kosher restaurant
 List of kosher restaurants

References

External links

 
Jewish cuisine